The Tongguan Kiln, also called the Changsha Kiln, is located in Wazhaping, Tongguan Subdistrict, Changsha, Hunan, China. It is one of the major kiln sites in Tongguan to be protected at the national level. The place was a historical kiln site of potteries in the Tang (618–907 AD) and Five Dynasties periods (907–960 AD).

The site covers about 68 hectares and found in 1956, it was the source place of underglaze by the Palace Museum's identification in 1957. The place was published one of the Major Historical and Cultural Sites Protected at the National Level by the State Council in January 1988, and was classified as one of the 100 Great Sites Protection Plan from 2006.

References

Bibliography
 

Chinese pottery kiln sites
History of Changsha
Wangcheng District
Major National Historical and Cultural Sites in Hunan
1950s archaeological discoveries
National archaeological parks of China
Tourist attractions in Changsha